Appalakunta is a village in Kirekera post, Hindupur Taluk, Anantapur district in the Indian state of Andhra Pradesh.

References

Villages in Anantapur district